Russell (Rust man) Frank Hodgson  (born 29 March 1981) in Hutton Rudby, Cleveland, is a speedway rider in the United Kingdom, who rode with the Redcar Bears in the Premier League. He is the son of former Middlesbrough captain Russ Hodgson. His grandfather Frank Hodgson is also a former Bears captain.

References 

1981 births
Living people
British speedway riders
English motorcycle racers
Redcar Bears riders